Wilhelm Maria Theodor Ernst Richard Graf von Mirbach-Harff (2 July 1871 – 6 July 1918) was a German diplomat, and was assassinated while ambassador to Moscow.

Biography
His parents were Ernst Graf von Mirbach and his wife Wilhelmine von Thun-Hohenstein (1851–1929).

von Mirbach started his diplomatic career in London, where he was Third Secretary at the German Embassy from 1899 til 1902, when he transferred to The Hague. From 1908 to 1911, Mirbach served as the embassy clerk in Saint Petersburg, and then as political councillor for the German military command in Bucharest. In 1915 he became the German ambassador in Greece, before being expelled from Athens in December 1916 when the Entente-leaning government of Eleftherios Venizelos took power.

He participated in the Russian-German negotiations in Brest-Litovsk from December 1917 to March 1918. He was appointed German ambassador to Russia in April 1918.

Mirbach was assassinated at the German embassy in Moscow by Yakov Grigorevich Blumkin and Nikolai Andreyev at the request of the Central Committee of the Left Socialist-Revolutionaries, who were trying to reignite the war between Russia and Germany. Blumkin entered Mirbach's residence in Moscow using forged papers and shot his victim at point blank range. As Mirbach tried to escape, Andreyev fired a second bullet and both of the assassins leapt out of the window and then drove away in a Cheka car. Mirbach's assassination signaled the beginning of the revolt of the Left Socialist-Revolutionaries in Moscow in 1918.

Mirbach was succeeded as German ambassador to Russia by Karl Helfferich.

Coincidentally, a later relative, Andreas von Mirbach, would be murdered by the Red Army Faction at the West German Embassy siege in Stockholm in 1975.

Honours
He received the following orders and decorations:
  Kingdom of Prussia:
 Order of the Red Eagle, 4th class, 1900

References

1871 births
1918 deaths
People from Bad Ischl
Deaths by firearm in Russia
Counts of Germany
Members of the Prussian House of Lords
Germany–Soviet Union relations
Treaty of Brest-Litovsk negotiators
Assassinated German people
Assassinated German diplomats
German people murdered abroad
Ambassadors of Germany to Russia
People murdered in Russia
Ambassadors of Germany to Greece
20th-century German diplomats